Football Association of Poltava Oblast is a football governing body in the region of Poltava Oblast, Ukraine. The federation is a member of the Football Federation of Ukraine.

At the end of 2017, the Federation reorganized as Football Federation of Poltavshchyna (ФФП, FFP) by excluding its collective members that participate in professional football, i.e. FC Vorskla Poltava, FC Hirnyk-Sport Horishni Plavni, FC Poltava, FC Kremin Kremenchuk. The new organization has replaced the former Football Federation of Poltava Oblast.

Previous Champions

1938    PVATU (1)
1939    no competition
1940    no competition
1941-44 World War II
1945    no competition
1946    FC Spartak Poltava (1)
1947    FC Dynamo Poltava (1)
1948    FC Dzerzhynets Kremenchuk (1)
1949    FC Lokomotyv Poltava (1)
1950    FC Lokomotyv Poltava (2)
1951    FC Spartak Poltava (2)
1952    FC Dzerzhynets Kremenchuk (2)
1953    FC Lokomotyv Poltava (3)
1954    FC Lokomotyv Poltava (4)
1955    FC Avanhard Kremenchuk (3)
1956(s) FC Enerhiya Poltava (1)
1956(f) FC Kolhospnyk Poltava (1)
1957    FC Lokomotyv Poltava (5)
1958    FC Lokomotyv Poltava (6)
1959    FC Kolhospnyk Khorol (1)
1960    FC Lokomotyv Poltava (7)
1961    FC Lokomotyv Poltava (8)
1962    FC Dnipro Kremenchuk (1)
1963    FC Strila Poltava (1)
1964    FC Zirka Poltava (1)
1965    FC Avanhard Kremenchuk (4)
1966    FC Suputnyk Poltava (1)
1967    FC Suputnyk Poltava (2)
1968    FC Suputnyk Poltava (3)
1969    FC Suputnyk Poltava (4)
1970    FC Vahonobudivnyk Kremenchuk (5)
1971    FC Promin Poltava (1)
1972    FC Suputnyk Poltava (5)
1973    FC Metalurh Kremenchuk (1)
1974    FC Suputnyk Poltava (6)
1975    FC Burevisnyk Poltava (1)
1976    FC Burevisnyk Poltava (2)
1977    FC Suputnyk Poltava (7)
1978    FC Metalurh Kremenchuk (2)
1979    FC Metalurh Kremenchuk (3)
1980    FC Lokomotyv Poltava (9)
1981    FC Suputnyk Poltava (8)
1982    FC Kooperator Poltava (1)
1983    FC Zirka Lubny (1)
1984    FC Avtomobilist Poltava (1)
1985    FC Motor Poltava (1)
1986    FC Motor Poltava (2)
1987    FC Avtomobilist Poltava (2)
1988    FC Avtomobilist Poltava (3)
1989    FC Avtomobilist Poltava (4)
1990    FC Avtomobilist Poltava (5)
1991    FC Psel Hadiach (1)
1992    FC Psel Hadiach (2)
1993    FC Lokomotyv Hrebinka (1)
1994    FC Lokomotyv Hrebinka (2)
1995    FC Velta Poltava (1)
1996    FC Lokomotyv Hrebinka (3)
1997    FC Psel Hadiach (3)
1998    FC Psel Hadiach (4)
1999    FC Psel Hadiach (5)
2000    FC Psel Hadiach (6)
2001    FC Pyriatyn (1)
2002    FC ZemlyaK Myrhorod (1)
2003    FC ZemlyaK Myrhorod (2)
2004    FC Kremin Kremenchuk (2)
2005    FC Kremin Kremenchuk (3)
2006    FC Velyka Bahachka (1)
2007    FC Velyka Bahachka (2)
2008    FC Velyka Bahachka (3)
2009    FC Velyka Bahachka (4)
2010    FC Velyka Bahachka (5)
2011    FC Temp Hradyzk (1)
2012    FC Nove Zhyttya Andriivka (1)
2013    FC Nove Zhyttya Andriivka (2)
2014    SC Poltava (1)
2015    FC Rokyta (1)
2016    FC Olympia Savyntsi (1)
2017    FC Olympia Savyntsi (2)
2018    FC Olympia Savyntsi (3)
2019    FC Olympia Savyntsi (4)
2020    FC Olympia Savyntsi (5)
2021    FC KLF Poltava (3)

Top winners
 9 – FC Lokomotyv Poltava 
 8 – FC Suputnyk Poltava 
 6 – FC Psel Hadiach 
 5 – 4 clubs (Avtomobilist Poltava, Velyka Bahachka, Vahanobudivnyk (Avanhard)), FC Olimpia Savyntsi 
 3 – 3 clubs (Metalurh Kremenchuk, Lokomotyv Hrebinka, Kremin (Dnipro))
 2 – 5 clubs (Spartak, Burevisnyk, Motor, ZemlyaK, Nove Zhyttya) 
 1 – 16 clubs

Professional clubs
 FC Spartak Poltava, 1946
 FC Vorskla Poltava (Kolkhoznik, Kolos, Selstroi), 1957-1968
 FC Dnepr Kremenchuk, 1963-1967

See also
 FFU Council of Regions

References

External links
 Informational resource. Football Federation of Potltavshchyna

Football in the regions of Ukraine
Football governing bodies in Ukraine
Sport in Poltava Oblast